Charles David Brooks (1881 – 7 February 1937) was a British cyclist. He competed in two events at the 1908 Summer Olympics. He won a bronze medal in the men's 2000 metres tandem, with William Isaacs.

References

External links
 

1881 births
1937 deaths
British male cyclists
Olympic cyclists of Great Britain
Cyclists at the 1908 Summer Olympics
Olympic bronze medallists for Great Britain
Olympic medalists in cycling
Medalists at the 1908 Summer Olympics
20th-century British people